The Old Scripps Building is a historic research facility on the campus of the University of California, San Diego in La Jolla, California.  Built in 1909-10, is the oldest oceanographic research building in continuous use in the United States, and the historic center of the Scripps Institution of Oceanography.  It is also architecturally significant as a work of Modernist architect Irving Gill, and for its early use of reinforced concrete.  It was declared a National Historic Landmark in 1982.  It now houses Scripps administrative offices.

Description and history
The Old Scripps Building is located overlooking the Pacific coast near the Ellen Browning Scripps Memorial Pier on the campus of the Scripps Institution of Oceanography. Windows are set by pairs in recessed bays, giving the surrounding concrete the appearance of structural piers. The interior plan has a wide central hall on each level, the areas on either historically used for a variety of purposes. Of particular note was the lecture hall at the western end of the second floor, which afforded views to the ocean.

The Scripps Institution of Oceanography was founded in 1903 as the Marine Biological Laboratory, and received a major donation in 1907 from Edward W. Scripps in the form of the land on which its campus now stands.  This building was constructed in 1909-10, funded by Scripps' sister, Ellen Browning Scripps, and was formally named in honor of her brother, George H. Scripps.  The building was designed by Irving Gill, a San Diego-based architect who was an proponent of Modernist architecture. It is an early example of reinforced concrete construction techniques.

In its early years, the building housed laboratories, offices, and also the residence of the institution's director.  For a number of decades it was used entirely for laboratories and research, and was vacated in 1977 after new facilities were built nearby.  The university proposed its demolition, in part because the building did not meet modern seismic codes.  Local preservationists banded together to raise funds for the building's restoration, including the reversal of alterations that interfered with the architect's original vision.

See also
 List of National Historic Landmarks in California
 San Diego Historical Landmarks in La Jolla, California

References

External links

Timeline of Scripps Institution of Oceanography history

Scripps Institution of Oceanography
Irving Gill buildings
La Jolla, San Diego
Buildings and structures completed in 1909
Buildings and structures in San Diego County, California
National Register of Historic Places in San Diego
National Historic Landmarks in California
1909 establishments in California